HMS Conn was a TE ("Buckley") Type Captain class frigate of the Royal Navy. She served during World War II as a convoy escort and anti-submarine warfare vessel in the Battle of the Atlantic and was credited with the destruction of two U-boats during the conflict.

Construction
Conn was ordered on 10 January 1942, as DE-80, a long-hulled turbo-diesel (TE) type destroyer escort, one of more than 500 such vessels built for Anti-Submarine Warfare to a collaborative British-American design.
She was laid down on 2 June 1943 at the Bethlehem Hingham Shipyard, in Hingham, Massachusetts, and was transferred during construction to the Royal Navy under Lend-Lease. She was launched on 21 August 1943 as HMS Conn, and was completed three months later on 31 October 1943.

Service history
After commissioning Conn was assigned to Western Approaches Command as a convoy escort and ASW vessel. After several voyages reinforcing a depleted B7 Escort Group in early 1944 Conn was assigned to 21 EG, and in the spring of 1944 part for the escort for several coastal convoys.  
In June Conn and 21 EG were part of Operation Neptune, the naval component of the Normandy landings escorting convoys and patrolling for U-boats.
In October Conn was part of the escort of Arctic convoy JW 61, with a new commander and as senior officer's ship of 21 EG. 
Her new Commanding Officer was Lt. Cdr. Raymond Hart DSC, an experienced and successful ASW officer.

In January Conn and 21 EG were operating as escort or support group to various Atlantic convoys; one of these, HX 332 came under attack, losing two ships, but despite an extensive hunt the U-boat (U-825) was not found.
In March 1945 Conn and 21 EG were assigned to patrol the north-east coast of Scotland; during this period the group found and destroyed four U-boats, with Conn being credited with two of these.

After the German surrender in May 1945 Conn moved to general duties, and with the final end of the war in August 1945 was prepared for return under the Lend-Lease agreement, to the United States for eventual disposal.

Battle honours
Conn earned the following battle honours for service:
 Arctic 1944
 Atlantic 1944-45
 English Channel 1944
 North Sea 1944-45

Successes
During her service Conn was credited with the destruction of two U-boats.

Depiction
A Stephen Bone painting of the bridge of HMS Conn as she escorts surrendering U-Boats at the end of the war is part of the Imperial War Museum's art collection. It is titled On Board HMS Conn Watching the Arrival of Fourteen U-Boats Which Surrendered at Loch Eriboll, Sutherlandshire: 7.30 PM.

Notes

References
 Clay Blair (1998) Hitler's U-Boat War Vol II: The Hunted 1942–1945 
 Peter Elliott (1977) Allied Escort Ships of World War II 
 R Gardiner, R Gray (1985) Conway's All the World's Fighting Ships 1906–1921  
 Paul Kemp ( 1997) U-Boats Destroyed . 
 Axel Neistle (1998) German U-Boat Losses during World War II. 
 VE Tarrant (1989) The U-Boat Offensive 1914-1945 Arms & Armour

External links
 Uboat.net page for HMS Conn
 captainclassfrigates.co.uk

 

Captain-class frigates
Buckley-class destroyer escorts
World War II frigates of the United Kingdom
Ships built in Hingham, Massachusetts
1943 ships